Evolution of Elevation  is the ninth album by Bizzy Bone.  It is the last of 4 albums he had released in the year 2006, following Thugs Revenge, The Story, and The Midwest Cowboy. A re-release version titled Evolution of Elevation: the Originals was released in 2007, with original cuts of all the tracks.

Track listing
"Intro"
"You Don't Really Wanna Be Me" (feat. Aeileon El Nino)
"Streets on Fire" (feat. Aeileon El Nino and King Josiah)
"Bye Bye"
"To the Top"
"Know All About You"
"Memories" (feat. Aeileon El Nino)
"My Name is Bryon"
"Evolution of Elevation"
"The Truth"
"Bye Bye" (Remix)
"Still Know All About You" (feat. Tha Realest)
"Outro"
"Water"  (Aeileon)

External links
 Bizzy Bone official site
 

2007 albums
Bizzy Bone albums